Andreas Nader (born 31 March 1975) is an Austrian rower. He competed in the men's coxless pair event at the 1996 Summer Olympics.

References

External links
 

1975 births
Living people
Austrian male rowers
Olympic rowers of Austria
Rowers at the 1996 Summer Olympics
Rowers from Linz